Gao Hongmiao (born 17 March 1974) is a Chinese race walker.

International competitions

References

1974 births
Living people
Chinese female racewalkers
Olympic athletes of China
Athletes (track and field) at the 1996 Summer Olympics
World Athletics Championships athletes for China
Asian Games gold medalists for China
Asian Games medalists in athletics (track and field)
Athletes (track and field) at the 1994 Asian Games
Medalists at the 1994 Asian Games
Universiade medalists in athletics (track and field)
Universiade gold medalists for China
World Athletics Race Walking Team Championships winners
Medalists at the 2001 Summer Universiade